FNME can stand for:

Ferrovie Nord Milano Esercizio, former name of an Italian transport company
National Federation of Mines and Energy, a French trade union
ICAO code for Menongue Airport, in Angola